Renauld Duvall Williams (born February 23, 1981) is a former Canadian football linebacker. He was signed by the San Francisco 49ers as an undrafted free agent in 2004. He played college football at Hofstra. Williams was also a member of the Miami Dolphins, Cleveland Browns, New York Jets, Saskatchewan Roughriders, Pittsburgh Steelers, and Hamilton Tiger-Cats.

Early years
Williams was a standout running back in high school at Friends Academy and was a four-year starter.

College career
Heavily recruited to play at Penn State, Williams was injured during his junior year which caused him to play at the University of New Hampshire. After two years of waiting to start he decided to transfer to Hofstra University where he became a two-year starter as a defensive lineman.

External links
Saskatchewan Roughriders bio

1981 births
Living people
People from Long Island
Players of American football from New York (state)
American football linebackers
American football defensive ends
American players of Canadian football
Canadian football linebackers
New Hampshire Wildcats football players
Hofstra Pride football players
San Francisco 49ers players
Miami Dolphins players
Cleveland Browns players
New York Jets players
Saskatchewan Roughriders players
Pittsburgh Steelers players
Hamilton Tiger-Cats players
People from Westbury, New York